The List of National Historic Landmarks in South Dakota contains the landmarks designated by the U.S. Federal Government for the U.S. state of South Dakota.

There are 16 National Historic Landmarks (NHLs) in South Dakota, one of which is shared with Iowa and listed by the National Park Service as primarily in that state.  They have been designated in 13 of South Dakota's 66 counties. Most are along rivers, long the chief areas of human settlement in this arid place.

Current NHLs

|}

Historic areas in the United States National Park System
National Historic Sites, National Historic Parks, National Memorials, and certain other areas listed in the National Park system are historic landmarks of national importance that are highly protected already, often before the inauguration of the NHL program in 1960, and are often not also named NHLs per se. Two additional South Dakota sites have national historical importance and have been designated as National Historic Site and as a National Memorial by the National Park System.

See also
National Register of Historic Places listings in South Dakota
History of South Dakota

References

South Dakota
 
South Dakota-related lists
National Historic Landmarks